Nandini Ramanna, better known by her stage name Bhavana Ramanna, is an Indian actress who works predominantly in the Kannada film industry. A Bharatanatyam dancer, she has received three Karnataka State Film Awards and acted in Shanti, a film that entered the Guinness Book of Records. Bhavana Ramanna is the director of HomeTown Productions, a production house that conducts dance and music shows.

Career
Bhavana was born as Nandini Ramanna before her name was changed by Kodlu Ramakrishna.

Bhavana trained to be a classical dancer and initially had no intention of acting; "[f]ilms just happened by chance." She learned Bharatanatyam for nearly ten years and aspired for a career as a stage choreographer. She began her career in films with Maribele, a Tulu film, after she was cast by Krishnappa Uppur who "saw me at a wedding and was pleased with my looks." The film did not do well, but Bhavana was noted by the Kannada film producers. After Maribale she got noticed further for her role as a cop in No.1, a Kannada film. As she found the going easy her inconsequential film Nee Mudida Mallige brought her sour experience.

Bhavana was cast in Seetharam Karanth’s musical hit Chandramukhi Pranasakhi, where she acted alongside Ramesh Aravind, and Prema. Bhavana did Kavitha Lankesh’s Deveeri which got Aravindan Puraskar award. In Rashtrageethe she got a vamp role from noted director K. V. Raju. She was not in a position to denounce the offer, as the director was a stalwart. Director and cinematographer of Malayalam films Dinesh Babu offered her a role opposite Ramesh Aravind, but to Bhavana’s bad luck Deepavali, also starring Vishnuvardhan failed at the box office. She also had a song in Vishnuvardhan's Parva . Bhavana did an Item Dance in film Ninagagi. Bhavana acted in Kavita Lankesh's second film, Alemaari. Alemaari, made for the National Film Development Corporation, was previewed at many prestigious film festivals. but the Films Division did not release her film. Shanti, an off-beat Kannada film directed by the noted writer, Baragur Ramachandrappa, has earned the rare distinction of being the second Indian film to enter the Guinness Book of World Records. It has entered the Guinness Book for in the category `Fewest actors in a narrative film'. It was adjudged the second best film for the State award. Bhavana moved to Mumbai and even did a Bollywood film, Family, which also starred Amitabh Bachchan.

Bhavana was adjudged the "Best Actress" for her role in Bhagirathi. She was one of Top Kannada Actresses of 2010 by Rediff.

Filmography

Television
 Godrej Game Aadi
 Life Change Maadi
 Ramachaari

Politics
Bhavana campaigned for Congress candidates in the 2013 assembly elections in Davanagere among other constituencies. In 2012, she had campaigned for Jayaprakash Hegde of the Congress in Chikmagalur by-election to the Lok Sabha. In 2018 Bhavana Ramanna officially joined BJP

References

External links
 

Living people
1970s births
Year of birth missing (living people)
Indian film actresses
Performers of Indian classical dance
Bharatanatyam exponents
Actresses in Kannada cinema
21st-century Indian actresses
Indian women television presenters
Indian television presenters
Actresses from Karnataka
People from Shimoga district
Actresses in Kannada television
20th-century Indian dancers
Dancers from Karnataka
Indian television actresses
20th-century Indian women